Straight Outta Nowhere: Scooby-Doo! Meets Courage the Cowardly Dog is a 2021 American animated comedy film produced by Warner Bros. Animation, and is the thirty-sixth entry in the direct-to-video series of Scooby-Doo films. The film is a crossover between Scooby-Doo and the Cartoon Network show Courage the Cowardly Dog.  The film was released on DVD and Digital on September 14, 2021.

Plot 
During the unmasking of a bank-robbing clown, Scooby-Doo hears a strange noise and is driven to dance and then runs away. Meanwhile, Courage appears to be having the same problem, though Courage's owners Muriel and Eustace Bagge don't seem to notice. The gang rushes after Scooby only to find that they have ended up in Nowhere, Kansas, where a group of hostile cicadas is surrounding Courage and Scooby. After killing the cicadas, they are called inside the Bagge household and they properly meet Muriel and Eustace.

Both the Scooby gang and the Bagge family are invited to dinner with the Mayor of Nowhere, but on the way there, Scooby and Courage are attacked by a giant Cicada Queen, resulting in the destruction of Eustace's truck. Arriving at the Mayor's mansion, the Mayor offers to give them a tour of an attached museum detailing Nowhere's bizarre history of attracting weirdness to the town. However, Shaggy, Scooby and Courage look for something to eat, while Eustace heads back to the Bagge residence to rid himself of the nuisance. An attack by the Cicada Queen and her brood knocks Fred, Daphne, Velma and Muriel into a hidden cave, where they discover a strange machine randomly sending out cellphone calls; Shaggy, Scooby and Courage destroy it while escaping the Cicada Queen.

Attempting to return to the Bagge residence to unravel the mystery, the group is once again attacked by the Cicada Queen, which kidnaps most of them, leaving only Scooby and Courage behind. Plugging Velma's personal tablet into Courage's computer, they discover that the cicada's unnatural size (and every other strange encounter Courage dealt with) was the result of a dark matter meteor (the one presumably to have wiped out the dinosaurs), which is buried under the spot where the Bagge house is. Courage and Scooby retrieve the meteor and rescue their friends, but their attempt to escape is thwarted by the Cicada Queen, who takes the meteor and holds Muriel hostage, forcing Courage to face his fears and confront it. After a long battle, the Cicada Queen is trapped under scraps from the Bagge windmill.

The General and the Lieutenant soon arrive to apprehend the Cicada Queen, which is revealed to be a mech piloted by two of Courage's most recurring enemies: the villainous feline mastermind Katz and the French con artist duck Le Quack. After discovering the meteor's existence, they teamed up to take over Nowhere's political facilities and to use the resources to dig up the meteor to hypnotize and rob several well off locals, stashing it at the Bagge residence (Eustace discovered this earlier, but wrote it off as a windfall on his end); when they learned the Scooby gang was in the area, they used the meteor to brainwash the local cicada population to scare them off in an attempt to "up their game". The General attempts to secure the meteor to be used ostensibly as a weapon, but, at Courage's suggestion, it is turned into a disco ball so the group can celebrate. Therefore, he closes the movie by saying "Well, goodnight, folks. Bye!", bidding the audience farewell.

Voice cast 
 Frank Welker as Scooby-Doo, Fred Jones
 Grey Griffin as Daphne Blake, Frau Glockenspiel
 Matthew Lillard as Shaggy Rogers
 Kate Micucci as Velma Dinkley, Velma's Tablet
 Jeff Bennett as General, Self Help Book
 Jeff Bergman as Eustace Bagge, Computer, Mayor
 Marty Grabstein as Courage, Clown, Mr. McGill
 Chuck Montgomery as Lieutenant, Mr. Glockenspiel
 Paul Schoeffler as Katz, Le Quack, Nowhere Newsman
 Thea White as Muriel Bagge, Rich Old Lady

Production 
According to animator and artist Tracy Mark Lee, the film's original premise was pitched as an episode of Scooby-Doo and Guess Who?.

John R. Dilworth, the original creator of Courage the Cowardly Dog, was not involved with the movie's production. Maxwell Atoms, creator of The Grim Adventures of Billy & Mandy and director of Happy Halloween, Scooby-Doo!, was originally approached to direct the film. He declined upon learning that John R. Dilworth was not involved.

Marty Grabstein and Thea White reprised their roles as Courage and Muriel Bagge, while voice actor Jeff Bergman voiced Eustace Bagge, taking over from actors Lionel Wilson and Arthur Anderson, due to the latter dying in 2003 and 2016, respectively. Bergman had previously voiced Eustace prior in a commercial advert for Cartoon Network's 20th anniversary back in 2012.

The crossover marks the final acting credit of Thea White, who died during surgery on July 30, 2021, due to liver cancer, and the film was dedicated to her memory.

In addition to White’s passing, this is also the second film to posthumously give special credit to original Scooby-Doo creators Joe Ruby and Ken Spears following Scooby-Doo! The Sword and the Scoob, as they had died in August and November 2020, respectively.

Release 
Straight Outta Nowhere: Scooby-Doo! Meets Courage the Cowardly Dog was released on DVD and Digital HD on September 14, 2021, by Warner Bros. Home Entertainment (through Studio Distribution Services).

The film made its TV premiere on Cartoon Network on October 7, 2022, at 7 pm ET/PT.

Reception 
Dillon Gonzales, writing for Geek Vibes Nation, gave the film a positive review, saying "there are moments that feel a bit padded to justify a feature-length effort, but it is easy to give them a pass as you enjoy spending time with these characters". Becky O'Brien of Cinelinx also gave a positive review, saying the film "exceeded all of my expectations. This is a movie fans of both series will enjoy. It is literally a love letter to everything that makes both Scooby-Doo and Courage the Cowardly Dog fun to watch". 

Common Sense Media gave the film 2 out of 5 stars.

Boca do Inferno said, "it's worth it for the opportunity to see them again on stage, fighting monsters with fear, sympathy and a lot of voracity."

References

External links 

 

2020s American animated films
2020s children's animated films
2020s supernatural films
2021 adventure films
2021 animated films
2021 comedy films
2021 direct-to-video films
2021 films
American children's animated adventure films
American children's animated comedy films
American children's animated mystery films
American comedy horror films
American direct-to-video films
American monster movies
American mystery films
Animated crossover films
Animated films about dogs
Animated films about insects
Courage the Cowardly Dog
2020s English-language films
Films about curses
Films based on television series
Films directed by Cecilia Aranovich
Films set in Kansas
Hanna-Barbera animated films
Scooby-Doo direct-to-video animated films
Warner Bros. Animation animated films
Warner Bros. direct-to-video animated films